Nikolay Vasiliyevich Karpol  (1 May 1938, Bereznitsa village, former Polesie Voivodeship, Republic of Poland) is a Russian women's volleyball coach and a longstanding coach of the Soviet and then Russian women's national teams.. Known as The Howling Bear, Karpol was a regular at the Olympic Games, with his teams usually earning a last call on the Olympic podium, winning gold medals in 1980 and 1988 and taking the silver medals in 1992, 2000 and 2004 for a total of five Olympic medals. In 2020, he set a new world record by coaching Uralochka for 51 years.

Honours
Olympics Games (as coach):
 1980, 1988 – gold, 
 1992, 2000, 2004 – silver.

World Championships:
 1990 – gold, 
 1994, 1998, 2002 – bronze.

Championships of Europe:
 1977 (coach), 1979, 1989, 1991, 1993, 1997, 1999, 2001 – gold

World Grand Champions Cup:
 1993 – bronze,
 1997 – gold, 
 2001 – silver.

Grand-prix:
 1997, 1999, 2002 – gold, 
 1998, 2000, 2003 – silver, 
 1993, 1996, 2001 – bronze.

Winner of the European Championese League (Champions Cup): 
 1981–1983, 1987, 1989, 1990, 1994, 1995.

For lifetime dedication and great career, he was inducted in 2009 to the Volleyball Hall of Fame.

Croatian journalist and publicist Tomislav Birtic published a book Karpol: Lunatics - That's What I Need.

Honours and awards
 Order of Merit for the Fatherland, 3rd class
 Honoured Worker of Physical Culture, Russia
 Order of Friendship
 Order of the Red Banner of Labour
 Order of Friendship of Peoples
 Honorary Citizen of the Sverdlovsk Oblast

References

External links
 FIVB Profile

1938 births
Living people
People from Pruzhany District
Russian volleyball coaches
Recipients of the Order "For Merit to the Fatherland", 3rd class
Recipients of the Order of Friendship of Peoples
Honoured Coaches of Russia
Soviet volleyball coaches